The 1998–99 FA Trophy was the thirtieth season of the FA Trophy.

1st round

Ties

Replays

2nd round
The teams that given byes to this round are Cheltenham Town, Doncaster Rovers, Woking, Rushden & Diamonds, Morecambe, Hereford United, Hednesford Town, Northwich Victoria, Welling United, Yeovil Town, Hayes, Dover Athletic, Kettering Town, Stevenage Borough, Southport, Kidderminster Harriers, Farnborough Town, Leek Town, Telford United, Forest Green Rovers, Barrow, Kingstonian, Slough Town, Chorley, Colwyn Bay, Merthyr Tydfil, Leigh R M I, Sutton United, Hendon, Emley, Altrincham, Basingstoke Town, Atherstone United, St Albans City, Nuneaton Borough, Gravesend & Northfleet, Chesham United, Tamworth, Bromley, Rothwell Town, Dulwich Hamlet, Aylesbury United, Bromsgrove Rovers, Aldershot Town, Worksop Town, Sittingbourne, Ashford Town (Kent), Yeading, Alfreton Town, Hitchin Town, Oxford City, Fisher Athletic London, Margate, Droylsden, Lincoln United, Uxbridge, Raunds Town, Moor Green, Witton Albion, Romford, Clevedon Town, Bognor Regis Town, Havant & Waterlooville, Dartford, Worthing, Tonbridge Angels, Whitley Bay, Berkhamsted Town, Bedworth United, Racing Club Warwick, Shepshed Dynamo, Netherfield Kendal, Barton Rovers, Evesham United, Harrogate Town, Corby Town, Great Harwood Town, Andover, Burscough and Hucknall Town.

Ties

Replays

3rd round

Ties

Replays

4th round

Ties

Replays

5th round

Ties

Replays

Quarter finals

Ties

Semi finals

First leg

Second leg

Final

Tie

References

General
 Football Club History Database: FA Trophy 1998-99

Specific

1998–99 domestic association football cups
League
1998-99